Danny van der Ree (born 21 September 1988) is a Dutch professional footballer who currently plays as a defender for DHC Delft.

Club career
He played 3 matches for FK AS Trenčín on an exchange from TONEGIDO in 2008. Van der Ree comes from ADO Den Haag's own youth squad and won his first professional contract for the 2010–11 season.

External links
Voetbal International 

1988 births
Living people
Eredivisie players
ADO Den Haag players
VSV TONEGIDO players
Dutch footballers
Footballers from The Hague
Association football defenders
Dutch expatriate sportspeople in Slovakia